Malcolm McKay (January 3, 1873 – December 11, 1928) was a Canadian politician. He represented the electoral district of Inverness County in the Nova Scotia House of Assembly from 1925 to 1928. He was a Liberal-Conservative member.

Born in 1873 in Inverness County, Nova Scotia, McKay was a businessman. He was elected in the 1925 election, and defeated when he ran for re-election in 1928. McKay died on December 11, 1928 at Whycocomagh, Inverness County.

References

1873 births
1928 deaths
Progressive Conservative Association of Nova Scotia MLAs
People from Inverness County, Nova Scotia